Alina Astafei (known before 1995 as Galina Astafei; born 7 June 1969) is a Romanian-German track and field athlete who attained German citizenship in 1995. She was one of the world's leading high jumpers in the 1990s. Representing Romania, she became the 1992 Olympic silver medallist, while representing Germany, she won a silver medal at the 1995 World Championship and the 1995 world indoor title.

Career
Astafei won the 1987 European Junior title and cleared 2.00 metres to win the 1988 World Junior title. At the 1988 Seoul Olympics, she finished equal fifth in the final with 1.93 metres. Her biggest success for her native Romania was when winning the silver medal at the 1992 Olympic Games in Barcelona, Spain, where she cleared 2.00 m.

On 9 January 1995, Astafei left the Romania track and field association and attained German citizenship on 1 March 1995. She won the 1995 World indoor title in Barcelona with a clearance of 2.01 m, before going on to clear 1.99 m to win the silver medal at the 1995 World Championships in Gothenburg, behind Stefka Kostadinova. At her third Olympic Games in 1996, she finished equal fifth with 1.96 m. Her outdoor personal best of 2.01 metres was set in 1995, while she set her indoor best of 2.04 m, earlier the same year.

She became German champion in 1995, 1996, 1998 and 2001 as well as German indoor champion in 1995, 1996, 1997 and 1998. She represented the clubs USC Mainz and MTG Mannheim.

Achievements
In the list the results until 1994 for Romania.
 1986, Junior World championship: 2nd place (1.90 m)
 1987, Junior European championship: 1st place (1.88 m)
 1988, Olympic Games: 5th place (1.93m); Junior World championship: 1st place (2.00 m)
 1989, World Cup final: 3rd place (1.94 m); Europa Cup final: 1st place (2.00 m)
 1992, Olympic Games: 2nd place (2.00 m); World Cup final: 2nd place (1.91 m)
 1993, World championship: 4th place (1.94 m); Europa Cup final: 1st place (2.00 m)
 1995, World championship: 2nd place (1.99 m); Europa Cup final: 1st place (2.00 m)
 1996, Olympic Games : 5th place (1.96m); Europa Cup final: 1st place (1.98 m)
 1997, World championship: 3rd place (1.95 m)
 1998, European championship: 3rd place (1.95 m); World Cup final: 6th place (1.90 m); Europa Cup final: 2nd place (1.95 m)
 2001, Europa Cup final: 1st place (1.89 m)

Personal life
Astafei’s father is the former Romanian pole vaulter Petre Astafei Sr. Her brother Petre Jr. was a rugby player; he died aged 22 during the 1989 Romanian Revolution. Astafei was married to the Romanian national volleyball player Alin Stavariu, but they divorced before 1995. On 1 March 1995 she obtained German citizenship and later changed her name from Galina to Alina. In Germany she married high jumper Wolfgang Kreißig. She has four children, three with Kreißig and one from the previous marriage.

See also
 Female two metres club

References

External links 
 
 
 

1969 births
Living people
Sportspeople from Bucharest
Romanian female high jumpers
Romanian emigrants to Germany
German female high jumpers
German people of Romanian descent
Athletes (track and field) at the 1988 Summer Olympics
Athletes (track and field) at the 1992 Summer Olympics
Athletes (track and field) at the 1996 Summer Olympics
Olympic athletes of Romania
Olympic silver medalists for Romania
Olympic athletes of Germany
World Athletics Championships medalists
European Athletics Championships medalists
Medalists at the 1992 Summer Olympics
Olympic silver medalists in athletics (track and field)
Universiade medalists in athletics (track and field)
Universiade gold medalists for Romania
USC Mainz athletes
MTG Mannheim athletes
World Athletics Indoor Championships winners
Medalists at the 1989 Summer Universiade